Aptinoderus is a genus of beetles in the family Carabidae, containing the following species:

 Aptinoderus cyaneus (Motschulsky, 1864)
 Aptinoderus cyanipennis (Chaudoir, 1876)
 Aptinoderus funebris (Peringuey, 1899)
 Aptinoderus peringueyi (Csiki, 1933)
 Aptinoderus umvotianus (Peringuey, 1904)

References

Brachininae